The Turkish Badminton Federation (TBF) is the governing body for badminton in Turkey. It aims to govern, encourage and develop the sport for all throughout the country.

History
The TBF was established on 31 May 1991. Its first president was İrfan Yıldırım. The TBF was accepted by International Badminton Federation as the 104th member at 3 November 1991. Continentally, it is a member of the Badminton Europe confederation.

After the first elections held for sports federations in Turkey on 5 December 1993, Akın Taşkent became the second president of the federation (but the first elected). Between 1997–2004, the federation was governed by A. Faik İmamoğlu, serving for two terms. Since 2004 Murat Özmekik has been the federation's president.

The federation organizes the Turkish National Badminton Championships, the Turkiye International and the Turkish Badminton League.

Leagues
After the first tournament with 24 teams from 11 regions, 8 teams won the right to compete at Turkish Badminton League.

Today the federation organizes the following leagues in Turkey:
Badminton First League: 12 teams
Badminton Second League: 20 teams
Juniors First League: 12 teams
Juniors Second League: 20 teams
University First and Second League: Teams of 38 universities.

International competitions

Participation
Turkey participated for the first time at the Olympics in 2012 with Neslihan Yiğit, who was eliminated in the women's singles group stage.

Hosted
 2013 European Junior Badminton Championships - Ankara Arena in Ankara, 22–31 March 2013

References

External links
 Türkiye Badminton Federasyonu official site (Turkish)
 Adiyaman Badminton City Delegacy Official website (Turkish)

National members of the Badminton World Federation
Federation
Badminton
Organizations based in Ankara
Sports organizations established in 1991
1991 establishments in Turkey